Yaqub Lengeh (also Romanized as Ya‘qūb Lengeh) is a village in Miyan Kaleh Rural District, in the Central District of Behshahr County, Mazandaran Province, Iran. At the 2006 census, its population was 999, in 246 families.

References 

Populated places in Behshahr County